The Puerto Cabello Municipality is one of the 14 municipalities (municipios) that makes up the Venezuelan state of Carabobo. According to the 2011 census by the National Institute of Statistics of Venezuela, the municipality has a population of 182,493. The city of Puerto Cabello is the shire town of the Puerto Cabello Municipality.

History

Due to Puerto Cabello's location it was attacked by buccaneers and was a popular market for Dutch smugglers during the colonial era. It was the last Spanish royalist stronghold during Venezuela's war for independence, it was captured by José Antonio Páez in 1823.

Demographics
The Puerto Cabello Municipality, according to a 2007 population estimate by the National Institute of Statistics of Venezuela, has a population of 194,593 (up from 176,552 in 2000). This amounts to 8.7% of the state's population.

Government
The mayor of the Puerto Cabello Municipality is Rafael Lacava, elected on November 23, 2008, with 58% of the vote.  He replaced Osmel Vicente Ramos Dolande shortly after the elections. The municipality is divided into eight parishes: Bartolomé Salom, Borburata, Democracia, Fraternidad, Goaigoaza, Juan José Flores, Patanemo, and Unión.

See also
Puerto Cabello
Carabobo
Municipalities of Venezuela

References

External links
puertocabello-carabobo.gov.ve 

Municipalities of Carabobo
Puerto Cabello